The 13th Cavalry Division (13-ya Kavaleriiskaya Diviziya) was a cavalry formation of the Russian Imperial Army.

Organization
1st Cavalry Brigade
13th Regiment of Dragoons
13th Uhlan Regiment
2nd Cavalry Brigade
13th Regiment of Hussars
13th Regiment of Cossacks
13th Horse Artillery Division

Commanders (Division Chiefs) 
 1905: Evgeny Sykalov
 1909: baron Nikolai von der Ropp

Commanders of the 1st Brigade
 1905: Alexei von Krusenstern
 1909: Petr Myshetsky

Commanders of the 2nd Brigade
 1905: Petr Myshetsky
 1908–1914: Gleb Vannovsky

References

Cavalry divisions of the Russian Empire
Military units and formations disestablished in 1918